Roger Shepherd Duff  (11 July 1912 – 30 October 1978) was a New Zealand ethnologist and museum director.

Biography
Duff was born in Invercargill, New Zealand in 1912. He is the son of Oliver Duff founding editor of the New Zealand Listener, and helped raise his nephew, writer Alan Duff. He started work at Canterbury Museum in 1938 and became its director ten years later. Duff excavated skeletons of moa, an extinct flightless bird, at Pyramid Valley in north Canterbury and at the Wairau Bar in Marlborough.

Duff brought proof through his scientific papers of the existence of Moa-hunters as an early and distinct form of Māori culture. He developed and defended one of three major theories as to the origins of the Polynesian people: he believed, on the basis mainly on the physical differences, that the ancestors of the Polynesians could not have come from Asia via the Melanesian island. His main idea was that they had moved south from the area around Taiwan, through the Micronesian islands (mainly coral attols) to Fiji, Tonga and Samoa.  From here they radiated out into the Pacific through Tahiti and the Society Islands: north and east to Hawaii; east and south to reach the Marquesas and Easter Island, and south and to the West to New Zealand.

He was highly critical of the hypothesis of American origins promoted by Thor Heyerdahl which was popularised by the voyage of the Kon Tiki  Over the years with accumulation of evidence (both pro and contrary) these three theories have all been modified to various degrees, but no one hypothesis has ever found universal acceptance (see Māori people).

Especially for his work on the Wairau Bar, Duff received many honours and awards, including the Percy Smith Medal (1948), a Doctor of Science from the University of New Zealand (1951), election to fellowship of the Royal Society of New Zealand (1952), and the Hector Memorial Medal (1956). In 1953, Duff was awarded the Queen Elizabeth II Coronation Medal. In the 1977 Queen's Silver Jubilee and Birthday Honours, he was appointed a Commander of the Order of the British Empire, for services as director of the Canterbury Museum since 1948.

Duff collapsed at his museum on 30 October 1978 and died.

References

1912 births
1978 deaths
People from Invercargill
New Zealand ethnologists
New Zealand archaeologists
Fellows of the Royal Society of New Zealand
Māori studies academics
Directors of Canterbury Museum, Christchurch
New Zealand Commanders of the Order of the British Empire
20th-century New Zealand scientists